Jorge Zalszupin (1 June 1922 – 17 August 2020) was a Polish-Brazilian architect and designer noted for modern design. He was born in Warsaw, Poland. In the 1950s Zalszupin founded L'Atelier, a furniture design manufacturer in Sao Paulo, Brazil. Zalszupin's one-off designs were included by Oscar Niemeyer in the Palácio da Alvorada and the Palácio do Planalto.

References

1922 births
2020 deaths
Brazilian architects
Polish emigrants to Brazil
Modernist designers
Modernist architects
Brazilian Jews